Borovskoy is a village in Shangskoye Rural Settlement of Sharyinsky District, Kostroma Oblast, Russia. Its population is 30 as of 2014.

History 
The village received this name in 1966.

Geography 
Borovskoy is located 13 km south of Sharya (the district's administrative centre) by road.

References

External links 
 Borovskoy on komandirovka.ru

Rural localities in Kostroma Oblast
Populated places in Sharyinsky District